Toogoolawah is a rural town and locality in the Somerset Region, Queensland, Australia.

Geography
Toogoolawah is in South East Queensland. Toogoolawah is a centre for gliding and parachuting and in the past the centre of a dairying industry.  Cressbrook Creek, a tributary of the Brisbane River, passes through the town as does the Brisbane Valley Highway.

Naming
The district was originally known as Cressbrook after the Cressbrook Station operated by James Henry McConnel. The town took its present name Toogoolawah from its former railway station, which was named in November 1903 using the name Tugulawah proposed by McConnel, the name of the McConnel's residence at Bulimba, Brisbane (now known as Bulimba House). McConnel had originally suggested the name Bakewell after a village in Derbyshire, for the new town and railway station, but the Queensland Railways Department wanted to use an Aboriginal name.

Toogoolawah is derived from the Aboriginal words "dhoo" (a generic term for tree) and "goo/lawa", meaning "crescent shaped" or "bent like a crescent moon". The name probably referred to a tree with a deformed trunk which stood on the site in Bulimba, rather than to the supposed shape outlined by the Brisbane River as it rounds Bulimba Point, as has been alleged.

History
Cressbrook Provisional School was operating in 1881 but closed in 1882 due to low student numbers; its opening date is unknown.

What is now Toogoolawah town was surveyed privately when Cressbrook estate was subdivided and sold as dairy farms in 1904. The town plan was not registered with the survey office until 1 June 1909. The extension of the Brisbane Valley railway line from Esk to the new town was opened on 8 February 1904.

A Toogoolawah receiving office was opened in June 1904 and was elevated to post office status in July 1905.

Toogoolawah Provisional School opened on 30 May 1905. On 1 January 1909, it became Toogoolawah State School. A secondary department was added on 28 January 1975 until a separate high school opened on 25 January 1988.

On Monday 10 September 1906, St Andrew's Anglican Church Hall was opened in Toogoolwah by Archbishop St Clair Donaldson. On Sunday 12 May 1912, St Andrew's Anglican Church was dedicated by Archbishop St Clair Donaldson.

A condensed milk factory was built shortly after the railway station was opened. The factory was closed in 1929, after Nestlé moved all its condensed milk production to Victoria, resulting in the town's population decreasing by half.

The Toogoolawah War Memorial commemorates those who served in World War I. Unlike most war memorials that were erected after the war, the Toogoolawah memorial was unveiled during the war on 31 March 1917 by the Rev. Chaplain Merrington.

On 20 October 1940, a church building was relocated to Toogoolawah to reopen in Gardner Street North as the Cornerstone Lutheran Church. It was formerly the Bethlehem Lutheran Church in Jeebropilly, which opened on 20 April 1898, closing circa 1938.

Toogoolawah State High School opened on 25 January 1988, replacing the secondary department attached to Toogoolawah State School.

Toogoolawah Library had a major refurbishment in 2006.

Toogoolawah was partially cut off by flooding as a result of the 2010–2011 Queensland floods.

Heritage listings 

Toogoolawah has a number of heritage-listed sites, including:
 Gunyah Street: Toogoolawah War Memorial
 58 Fulham Street: Inverness (house)
 2 Mangerton Street: St Andrew's Church
 Mangerton Street: St Andrew's Church Hall
 Mangerton Street: St Andrew's Rectory

Amenities
The Somerset Regional Council operate a public library at Gunyah Street.

There are three pubs in Toogoolawah, all situated on the main road.

Education 
Toogoolawah State School is a government primary (Early Childhood-6) school for boys and girls at Gardner Street. In 2017, the school had an enrolment of 171 students with 16 teachers (12 full-time equivalent) and 11 non-teaching staff (7 full-time equivalent).

Toogoolawah State High School is a government secondary (7-12) school for boys and girls at 76 Old Mount Beppo Road. In 2017, the school had an enrolment of 267 students with 33 teachers (29 full-time equivalent) and 22 non-teaching staff (14 full-time equivalent). Brisbane Valley Cluster Special Education Program is a primary and secondary (Early Childhood-12) special education program at Toogoolawah State High School at 76 Old Mount Beppo Road.

Attractions
Toogoolawah is home to a fun-jumping and tandem skydiving centre.

In popular culture 
Toogoolawah featured on the third season of The Mole in 2002.

Notable people
 Frederick Lancelot Nott, dairy farmer of Toogoolawah and Member of the Queensland Legislative Assembly for the Electoral district of Stanley

References

External links

 
 Town map of Toogoolawah, 1973
 Toogoolawah home page
 Toogoolawah Tourism Body

 
Towns in Queensland
Suburbs of Somerset Region
Localities in Queensland